Sinan Bolat (born 3 September 1988) is a Turkish professional footballer who plays as a goalkeeper for Belgian club Westerlo. He has played for Turkey both at youth level and senior level.

Club career

Early years
Bolat began his professional career at age 17 with Genk in 2005, but only managed a handful of matches in the league, including three starts. He transferred to Standard Liège on 29 December 2008, six months before his contract was due to expire with Genk.  He had previously been linked to both Fenerbahçe and Trabzonspor of the Turkish Süper Lig.

Standard Liège
Bolat is reported to have moved to Standard Liège for a transfer fee of just €150,000 in the January 2009 transfer window, on a 4.5-year contract.

2008–09 season
Bolat was Liège's preferred starting goalkeeper in the second half of the 2008–09 season due to Rorys Aragón losing favour. Bolat started the last seven matches of the season and kept five clean sheets, conceding only two goals: one in a 3–1 win against Germinal Beerschot and another in a 4–1 win against KV Mechelen. Bolat started the UEFA Cup match against S.C. Braga on 26 February 2009, and managed to keep a clean sheet during the first half. However, he was substituted off at half-time for the experienced Rorys Aragón, as the match finished 1–1.

In the final match of the 2008–09 season, Standard needed to win their match away to Gent in order to force a play-off against Anderlecht for the championship title. (If both points and number of matches won are tied, then a two-legged play-off decides the ultimate winner.) Standard were 1–0 ahead until the 92nd minute, when a penalty was awarded against them. Bolat became the hero of the night as he pulled off a magnificent save from Bryan Ruiz, ensuring the play-off. Standard went on to win the resulting play-off, winning 2–1 on aggregate, with Bolat keeping another clean sheet in the process, and were crowned champions on 24 May 2009. In his first season, he managed to keep six clean sheets out of nine matches and also saved a penalty. Winning the league automatically qualified Liège for the group stages of UEFA Champions League in the 2009–10 season. English Premier League clubs Manchester United and Arsenal were said to have made an offer for him in May 2009.

2009–10 season
Prior to the start of the 2009–10 season, Bolat helped his side to a 2–0 win in the 2009 Belgian Supercup final against Genk on 27 July 2009. In Liège's final UEFA Champions League group stage match, against AZ on 9 December, Bolat pushed upfield when a free-kick was awarded in the 95th minute, and he scored a headed goal to tie the match at 1–1. The draw clinched third place in the group for Liège and gave them a place in the UEFA Europa League at the expense of AZ. This enabled Bolat to earn his place in history as the only goalkeeper ever to score a goal in open-play in the UEFA Champions League.

Porto
Bolat joined Portuguese Primeira Liga club Porto on 30 of July 2013 on a free transfer. It was later confirmed he had signed a five-year contract.

Club Brugge
Bolat joined Club Brugge on loan from Porto for the 2015–16 season after Brugge starting goalkeeper Mathew Ryan left the side to join Valencia.

International career
Bolat has played at youth level for Turkey, winning four caps at the under-19 level and three at the under-21 level. He was called up by the senior national team for Turkey by then-head coach Fatih Terim for 2010 FIFA World Cup qualification matches in September 2009, but was an unused substitute.

Bolat gained his first cap on 10 August 2011 in a friendly match against Estonia at Türk Telekom Arena, a 3–0 victory.

Career statistics
.

Honours 
Standard Liège
Belgian First Division A: 2008–09
Belgian Cup: 2010–11
Belgian Super Cup: 2009

Galatasaray
Süper Lig: 2014–15
 Turkish Cup: 2014–15

Club Brugge
Belgian First Division A: 2015–16

Gent
Belgian Cup: 2021–22

References

External links
 
 
 
 

1988 births
Living people
People from Kayseri
Turkish footballers
Turkey international footballers
Turkey under-21 international footballers
Turkey youth international footballers
Turkish expatriate footballers
Turkish expatriate sportspeople in Belgium
Expatriate footballers in Belgium
Association football goalkeepers
Belgian people of Turkish descent
Belgian footballers
K.R.C. Genk players
K.V.C. Westerlo players
Standard Liège players
Club Brugge KV players
Royal Antwerp F.C. players
K.A.A. Gent players
Belgian Pro League players
Turkish expatriate sportspeople in Portugal
Expatriate footballers in Portugal
Primeira Liga players
FC Porto players
Liga Portugal 2 players
FC Porto B players
Süper Lig players
Kayserispor footballers
Belgium youth international footballers